Foster's Tavern is an upcountry 19th century historic landmark building in Spartanburg County, South Carolina, located at 191 Cedar Springs Road at the intersection of the old Pickneyville and Georgia roads (highways 56 and 295). As of May 2010, it was in private ownership. It is believed to be the oldest brick house in Spartanburg South Carolina, and was listed on the National Register of Historic Places on December 18, 1970.

History

Foster's Tavern was built by Anthony Foster, with construction beginning in 1801 and taking seven years or more to complete. The house is made from locally manufactured bricks, and features tied chimneys (separate chimneys joined by a wall or facade) at each end of a gable roof, hand carved woodwork (including bowed mantels and stair scrollwork), blown-glass windowpanes, soapstone hearths, cattle-hair plaster and original shutter pintles. The portico with its fanlight was added in 1845, and the porches in about 1915.

Foster's Tavern housed John C. Calhoun and Bishop Asbury on their travels through the area; the southeast corner room on the second floor came to be called the John C. Calhoun Room. Guests staying in it always vacated it when Calhoun came to stay.

References

External links
Nutt, Karen, 'Foster's Tavern' full of history, (Google cache) Spartanbug Herald Journal, July 9, 2000.
A Special Places Inventory of Spartanburg County, upstateforever.org, pp 14 and 47.
Johnson, Talmadge and Tally, Ghosts of the South Carolina Upcountry, The History Press, 2005, p. 66. 
Bobo, Ray, Edwin Henry Bobo, 1837–1886, a lieutenant when in the Confederate Army, later a lawyer, state representative and state senator, bought Foster's Tavern from the Anthony Foster Estate after the civil war.

Georgian architecture in South Carolina
Houses on the National Register of Historic Places in South Carolina
Houses completed in 1808
Houses in Spartanburg, South Carolina
National Register of Historic Places in Spartanburg, South Carolina